Andres Salumets (born 19 May 1971 in Jõhvi) is an Estonian biologist, biochemist, and international infertility expert. He currently is Professor of Reproductive Medicine at the Karolinska Institute.

Education
He completed his undergraduate and graduate studies at the University of Tartu in 1993 and 1995 respectively.  In 1995 he also became an embryologist at the Nova Vita Clinic, a private IVF provider in Estonia. In October 2003 he received his PhD at the University of Helsinki with the academic dissertation "Effects of embryological parameters on the success of fresh and frozen embryo transfers".

Career  
Following the completion of his PhD, he conducted research at the Estonian Biocentre  (2004 - 2007). He became a faculty member at the University of Tartu in 2008.   He became Professor of Reproductive Medicine at Karolinska Institute in September 2020. Salumets is currently a Member of the executive committee (2013–2015) of the European Society of Human Reproduction and Embryology and has published extensively in major scientific journals.
He is also a Board Member at the Competence Center for Reproductive Medicine and Biology, as well as the Project Manager for the scientific synergy "Novel approaches for human infertility diagnostics" for the sub-project: "Endometrial receptivity: systems biology approach".

References

External links
PubMed search for Andres Salumets

1971 births
Living people
Estonian biochemists
Estonian biologists
People from Jõhvi
Academic staff of the University of Tartu
University of Tartu alumni

Academic staff of the Karolinska Institute
University of Helsinki alumni